Via Rail operates 497 trains per week over nineteen routes. Via groups these routes into three broad categories:
 "Rapid Intercity Travel": daytime services over the Corridor between Ontario and Quebec. The vast majority of Via's trains–429 per week–operate here.
 "Long-distance travel and tourism": the famous Canadian and Ocean, providing traditional transcontinental service.
 "Mandatory Services": rural services mandated by the Canadian Government for areas which otherwise lack reasonable year-round transportation.

Current routes

Full listing

Intercity routes 

 Transferred from Canadian National Railway (CN)  Transferred from Canadian Pacific Railway (then known as CP Rail)  Active route

Commuter routes 

Via operated some grandfathered commuter passenger routes from CN and CP from 1977 until financial constraints led to cuts in 1981. A few became provincial commuter rail lines after transfer from Canadian National Railways or Canadian Pacific Railways.

References

External links 

 Via Rail: Trains by region

 
Canada railway-related lists